Hanspeter Lutz (born 26 September 1954) is a Swiss handball player. He competed in the men's tournament at the 1980 Summer Olympics.

References

1954 births
Living people
Swiss male handball players
Olympic handball players of Switzerland
Handball players at the 1980 Summer Olympics
Place of birth missing (living people)